Eugene Hewitt "Jigger" Lansing (January 11, 1898 – January 18, 1945) was a former Major League Baseball pitcher. He played one season with the Boston Braves in 1922.

References

External links

Boston Braves players
1898 births
1945 deaths
Baseball players from New York (state)
Sportspeople from Albany, New York
Major League Baseball pitchers
Charleston Pals players
People from Rensselaer, New York
Burials at Albany Rural Cemetery